The 2017 CONCACAF Champions League Final was the final of the 2016–17 CONCACAF Champions League, the 9th edition of the CONCACAF Champions League under its current format, and overall the 52nd edition of the premium football club competition organized by CONCACAF, the regional governing body of North America, Central America, and the Caribbean.

The final was contested in two-legged home-and-away format between Mexican teams UANL and Pachuca. The first leg was hosted by UANL at Estadio Universitario in San Nicolás de los Garza on April 18, 2017, while the second leg was hosted by Pachuca at Estadio Hidalgo in Pachuca on April 26, 2017. The winner would earn the right to represent CONCACAF at the 2017 FIFA Club World Cup, entering at the quarterfinal stage.

After a 1–1 draw in the first leg, Pachuca won the second leg 1–0 to defeat UANL 2–1 on aggregate to win their fifth CONCACAF club title.

Teams
In the following table, final until 2008 were in the CONCACAF Champions' Cup era, since 2009 were in the CONCACAF Champions League era.

For the seventh time in nine seasons of the CONCACAF Champions League, the final was played between two Mexican sides. This guaranteed a Mexican champion for the 12th straight year and 33rd time since the confederation began staging the tournament in 1962 (including the tournament's predecessor, the CONCACAF Champions' Cup).

Pachuca had won four CONCACAF club titles (2002, 2007, 2008, 2009–10), with their only title in the CONCACAF Champions League era coming in 2010, where they defeated Cruz Azul.

This was the second consecutive CONCACAF club final for UANL, with them losing in 2016, where they lost to América.

Venues

Road to the final

Note: In all results below, the score of the finalist is given first (H: home; A: away).

Format
The final was played on a home-and-away two-legged basis, with the higher-seeded team hosting the second leg. The away goals rule was used if the aggregate score is level after normal time of the second leg, but not after extra time, and so the final was decided by penalty shoot-out if the aggregate score is level after extra time of the second leg (Regulations, II. D. Tie-Breaker Procedures).

Matches

First leg

Second leg

References

External links
CONCACAF Champions League , CONCACAF.com

Finals
Tigres UANL matches
C.F. Pachuca matches
2016–17 in Mexican football
International club association football competitions hosted by Mexico
CONCACAF Champions League finals